Chelomophrynus is an extinct genus of prehistoric anurans in the family Rhinophrynidae. A single species is known, Chelomophrynus bayi from the Uintan Wagon Bed Formation of Wyoming. It was probably a subterranean feeder, like the modern member of the family, Rhinophrynus dorsalis. As most burrowing anurans, it likely used its hind feet for digging, thereby entering ground backwards.

See also

 Prehistoric amphibian
 List of prehistoric amphibians

References

Rhinophrynidae
Prehistoric amphibian genera
Eocene amphibians
Paleogene amphibians of North America
Fossil taxa described in 1991